Sometimes the Magic Works: Lessons from a Writing Life is a book by Terry Brooks.  First published in 2003, it seeks to give advice to aspiring writers, often telling some of the stories behind Brooks' own literature as an example.

References

Sources

External links

2003 non-fiction books
American autobiographies
Books about writing
Literary autobiographies